Carmen Cecilia Urbaneja is a Venezuelan producer best known for her association with Telemundo and RCTV. She is currently vice-president of Telemundo Studios production.

Filmography

References

External links 
 

Living people
Venezuelan film producers
Year of birth missing (living people)
Place of birth missing (living people)